In enzymology, a sulcatone reductase is an enzyme that catalyzes the chemical reaction

sulcatol + NAD+  sulcatone + NADH + H+

Thus, the two substrates of this enzyme are sulcatol and NAD+, whereas its 3 products are sulcatone, NADH, and H+.

This enzyme belongs to the family of oxidoreductases, specifically those acting on the CH-OH group of donor with NAD+ or NADP+ as acceptor. The systematic name of this enzyme class is sulcatol:NAD+ oxidoreductase.

References

 
 
 

EC 1.1.1
NADH-dependent enzymes
Enzymes of unknown structure